In Greek mythology, Gorgophonus (Ancient Greek: Γοργοφόνον means 'Gorgon-killing') was a Mycenaean prince as son of King Electryon and Anaxo, daughter of Alcaeus. He was the brother of Stratobates, Phylonomus, Celaeneus, Amphimachus, Lysinomus, Chirimachus, Anactor, Archelaus and Alcmena, mother of the hero Heracles.

Mythology 
Together with his brothers, Gorgophonus was killed by the sons of the Taphian king, Pterelaus who claimed the kingdom of their ancestor Mestor, son of Perseus and brother of Electryon.

Notes

References 

 Apollodorus, The Library with an English Translation by Sir James George Frazer, F.B.A., F.R.S. in 2 Volumes, Cambridge, MA, Harvard University Press; London, William Heinemann Ltd. 1921. ISBN 0-674-99135-4. Online version at the Perseus Digital Library. Greek text available from the same website.

Princes in Greek mythology